This is the discography of American rapper Proof. It includes solo work as well as collaborative work with other groups.

Studio albums

Extended plays

Mixtapes

Singles

Guest appearances
 1992 Bassmint Productions & Proof - Artificial Flavour
 1992 Eminem & Proof - Vanilla Ice Vs. MC Hammer
 1995 Eminem & Proof - Fuckin' Backstabber
 1995 Proof & Goon Squad - Good Lookin'
 1996 Proof & Bombshell - Introduction 
 1996 Proof & Bombshell - What You Talkin' Bout? (Interlude) 
 1996 Proof & Bombshell - You Can't Hide 
 1996 Proof - Da Science 
 1996 Proof - Wuch U No 
 1996 Proof & Poe Whosaine - No Doubt 
 1996 Proof & Slum Village - 5 Ela (Remix) 
 1997 Eminem, Proof, Bugz & Almighty Dreadnaughtz - Desperados
 1997 Eminem, Proof, B-Flat & Eye-Kyu - Dumpin'
 1997 Proof - Something Going On 
 1997 Proof & T. Stuckey - Motor City Anthem 
 1999 Proof & DJ Carl - Interlude 
 1999 Eminem & Proof - Tim Westwood Freestyle (SSLP) 
 2000 Proof, Bizarre, Royce Da 5'9" & Lab Animalz - Da 4 Horsemen 
 2002 Violence
 2001 The Big Gays 
 2002 Yzarc 
 2002 Shootacha 
 2002 Hittman 4 Hire 
 2002 1x1 (with J-Hill & Obie Trice)
 2002 Bounce Bounce (with Lola Damone)
 2002 We Ain't Leaving 
 2002 London Freestyle 
 2002 Time Flies (with Philpot)
 2002 Stainless (with PMC & Money)
 2004 Unborn Soldier (with Obie Trice)
 2004 Many Men (Remix) 
 2004 Ride Out 
 2004 E.S.H.A.M. 
 2004 Cali Trip 
 2004 Trife Niggas 
 2004 Whirlwind (with Kon Artis)
 2004 Kool With Me (with Da Omen)
 2004 We Comin' (with The Game)
 2004 DJ Thoro Mixtape Song (with Eminem)
 2005 No More to Say (with Trick-Trick & Eminem)
 2006 Our Time (with Chino XL)
 2006 Sick As They Come (with Liquidsilva)
 2006 Lay U Flat (with B-Real)
 2007 How I Live (with Twiztid)
 2008 Ups N Downs (with Ras Kass)
 2008 2gether 4 Ever (with Trick-Trick, Esham & Kid Rock)

5 Elementz 
5 Elementz was Proof's first group which consisted of three local Detroit rappers; himself, Thyme & Mudd. Also known as 5 Ela, the group worked with Proof a lot in his early career, featuring on three tracks on his 1996 vinyl single "Searchin'". Proof was heavily featured on their first three group projects before focusing more of his attention on D12. The group continued to release music after Proof's departure, their latest project "...Will Be Televised" was released in 2008. The group showed signs of a reunion before Proof's death in 2006. Mudd was featured on the track "Slum Elementz" from Proofs 2005 album Searching For Jerry Garcia and the group recently collaborated on the track "5 Ela Reunion" which was recorded for Time A Tell.

Guest appearances

Unreleased

Promatic

Albums

Misc. Tracks

Unreleased

References

Hip hop discographies